Vilcanchos is a district in the western Víctor Fajardo Province in Peru. It is bordered by Santiago de Chocorvos District (Huaytará Province) in the west, Totos District (Cangallo Province) in the north,  Sarhua District in the east, and  Santiago de Lucanamarca District (Huanca Sancos Province) in the south.

Geography 
Other mountains are listed below:

Ethnic groups 
The people in the district are mainly indigenous citizens of Quechua descent. Quechua is the language which the majority of the population (94.99%) learnt to speak in childhood, 4.86% of the residents started speaking using the Spanish language (2007 Peru Census).

References

External links
  Municipalidad Distrital de Vilcanchos
  Vilcanchos Tour